The 2015 West Sumatra gubernatorial election was held on 9 December 2015 in West Sumatra, Indonesia, as part of the simultaneous local elections. This election was held by the West Sumatra Regional General Elections Commission (KPU), to elect the Governor of West Sumatra along with their deputy to a 2016–2021 mandate.

The incumbent Governor Irwan Prayitno was eligible to run for a second term, and he was subsequently renominated for governor by the Prosperous Justice Party, in a coalition with the Great Indonesia Movement Party, who nominated Nasrul Abit for deputy governor.

Candidates 

This election was participated by two candidate pairs for governor and deputy governor.

Result

References

External links 
 West Sumatra Regional General Elections Commission .
Archive of the West Sumatra Regional KPU 

2015 Indonesian local elections
2015 Indonesian gubernatorial elections
West Sumatra
Politics of West Sumatra